This is a list of electoral division results for the Australian 1987 federal election in the state of Queensland.

Overall results

Results by division

Bowman

Brisbane

Capricornia

Dawson

Fadden

Fairfax

Fisher

Forde

Griffith

Groom

Herbert

Hinkler

Kennedy

Leichhardt

Lilley

Maranoa

McPherson

Moncrieff

Moreton

Oxley

Petrie

Rankin

Ryan

Wide Bay

See also 
 Results of the 1987 Australian federal election (House of Representatives)
 Members of the Australian House of Representatives, 1987–1990

References 

Queensland 1987